Market Square Shopping Centre is a mall located in the downtown core of Kitchener, Ontario, Canada, whose tenancy skews to services.

History
Built between 1971 and 1973 on the grounds of the original Kitchener City Hall in Kitchener, Ontario, Canada. It was home to an Eaton's (opened in 1973 and later became a Sears Canada retail store), and home to the Kitchener Farmer's Market from 1973 to 2004. A glass clock tower at the corner of King and Frederick Streets pays homage to the former city hall clock tower, which is now located at Victoria Park, Kitchener.

Decline
The mall has since declined, through the 1990s (with a half empty food court with long time McDonald's leaving in 2015) as shoppers have fled to larger malls in Regional Municipality of Waterloo like Conestoga Mall in Waterloo or Fairview Park Mall or Cambridge Centre to the south.

The other major tenants are triOS College and The Record, the latter of which occupies a former Sears Outlet store. Few retail stores remain in the mall, which is now primarily used as office space. Nordia Inc. operated a call centre on the uppermost floor of the former Eaton's until 2019.

The mall has a multi-level indoor parking along Duke Street and a walkway across to Oxlea Tower (22 Frederick Street), a large office tower across Frederick Street.

The mall is now owned by Europro Real Estate, which owns a number of buildings in the city's core.

Tenants
 Grill Inn
 Mr Wu's
 Service Canada
 triOS College
 Laura Mae Lindo, MPP, constituency office
 Conestoga College, campus for International Business, effective 2020

Transit Connections

Grand River Transit has a number of routes that have stops around the complex:

Bus Routes
 Route 1 Queen–River via stop on Frederick Street
 Route 3 Ottawa South via stop on Frederick Street
 Route 4 Glasgow via stop on Frederick Street
 Route 7 King via stops on King Street
 Route 204 iXpress Highland–Victoria via stops on Frederick Street

Light Rail
 ION light rail 301 at Frederick station

References

Shopping malls in Kitchener, Ontario
Defunct shopping malls in Canada
Shopping malls established in 1973
1973 establishments in Ontario